Pisani is an Italian surname which is also common in Malta. Notable people with the surname include:

Alfred Pisani (born 1939), Maltese hotelier
Alvise Pisani (1664–1741), Doge of Venice
André du Pisani (born 1949), Namibian political scientist
Andrea Pisani (1662–1718), Venetian admiral
Andrea Pisani (born 1987), Italian footballer
Angelo Pisani (died 1475), Italian Roman Catholic prelate, Bishop of Bagnoregio
Bob Pisani, news correspondent for the financial news network CNBC
Carmelo Borg Pisani (1915–1942), Maltese nationalist and Fascist
Edgard Pisani (1918–2016), French statesman, philosopher, and writer
Elizabeth Pisani (born 1964), American HIV Epidemiologist
Eugenio Pisani (born 1991), Italian auto racing driver 
Federico Pisani (1974–1997), Italian professional footballer 
Fernando Pisani (born 1976), Canadian professional ice hockey winger
Francesco Pisani (1494–1570), Italian Cardinal
Félix Pisani (1831–1920), French chemist and mineralogist
Gastón Pisani (born 1983), Argentine football midfielder with Italian citizenship
Giovanni Battista Pisani (17th century), Italian mathematician
John Pisani (born 1947), American soccer midfielder
Joseph Pisani, American artist, abstract painter, and photographer, living in Switzerland
Joseph R. Pisani (born 1929), New York politician
Jurgen Pisani (born 1992), Maltese footballer 
Luigi Pisani (1522–1570), Italian Roman Catholic bishop and cardinal
Maria Adeodata Pisani (1806–1855), Maltese saint
Niccolò Pisani (fl.1350–1354), Venetian admiral
Paul Pisani (1852–1933), Franciscan friar and historian from France
Pietro Pisani (1871–1960), Catholic archbishop and diplomat of the Holy See
Sandra Pisani (born 1959), Australian Olympic field hockey player
Tiffany Pisani (born 1992), British-Maltese model
Vettor Pisani (died 1380), Venetian admiral

See also 

 Pisani (disambiguation)
 Pisano (surname)

Italian-language surnames
Maltese-language surnames